Lanerossi is an Italian textile brand, established in the 19th century by Schio's Lanificio Rossi. Since 1987, the brand belongs to the Italian group Marzotto, which use it for the design, production, and marketing of textiles.

History 
In 1817, Francesco Rossi founded the Lanificio Rossi wool in Schio.

In 1849, Alessandro Rossi, son of Francesco Rossi, inherited the wool factory. Under his leadership, the company became one of the main industries in Italy. In 1873, the company became Lanificio Rossi s.p.a, a public limited company listed on the Milan Stock Exchange.

 In the 1960s, the Italian state acquired Lanerossi through the oil company ENI.

In 1987, Lanerossi was acquired by the competitor Marzotto Group, the current owner, with the consequent cancellation of the stock exchange. The brand has been active with a line of accessories and decorative fabrics. Due to a joint-venture with Marzotto group, Filivivi is the current licensee of the brand.

See also 

 L.R Vicenza Virtus
 Alessandro Rossi
 Economy of Italy

References 

1817 establishments in Italy
Clothing brands of Italy
Manufacturing companies established in 1817
Textile companies of Italy
Companies based in Veneto
Italian companies established in 1817
Schio